The Nokia 2730 classic is a Nokia Quad-band GSM/UMTS 3G cell phone that includes a camera, FM radio, Bluetooth, music and video player, as well as several internet-based applications (web browser, e-mail client, instant messaging).

Technical specifications

Key features
 2 megapixel camera, with a max resolution of 1600×1200 pixels for photos, and 176×144 pixels for video, at 15 frames per second.
 MP3, 'Tutan ringtones and user-created ringtones (Voice Recorder)
 FM radio (supports RDS)
 Bluetooth 2.0 + EDR
 SMS, MMS, email, and Nokia Xpress Audio Messaging
 30 MB internal dynamic memory, microSD memory card slot with hot swap, max. 2 GB (tests reveal that 8 GB and even 16 GB microSD cards works fine if you have firmware v10.45 or newer).

Operating frequency
 Europe: UMTS (WCDMA) 900/2100 and Quad Band GSM 850/900/1800/1900
 North America: UMTS (WCDMA) 850/1900 and Quad Band GSM 850/900/1800/1900

Dimensions
 Volume: 63.5 cc
 Weight: 73.2 g (without battery)
 Length: 109.6 mm
 Width: 46.7 mm
 Thickness: 12 mm

Display
 2 inch, 18-bit color depth (262,144 colors), 240×320 pixel.

Multimedia
 2-megapixel camera (Supports 1600 × 1200 pixels for photos and 176 × 144 pixels for video recording)
 Music player
 Plays AMR, AMR-WB, MIDI, MXMF, MP3, AAC, MP4/M4A/3GP/3GA(AAC, AAC+, eAAC+, AMR, AMR-WB), X-Tone, WAV(PCM, a-law, mu-law, ADPCM), WMA(WMA9, WMA10)
 Video player (174 × 144, 3gp formats or Flash formats)
 Voice recorder
 FM radio with RDS support
 5 band equalizer, with two customizable presets
 Image viewer
 Supports BMP, GIF87a, GIF89a, JPEG, PNG, WBMP, and have some support for SVG

Connectivity
 Bluetooth
 Supported Bluetooth Profiles: A2DP, AVRCP, DUN, FTP, GAP, GAVDP, GOEP, HFP, HSP, OPP, PBAP, SAP, SDAP, SPP
 MicroUSB (type B plug), supports USB 2.0
 Mass Storage Mode
 Nokia AV 3.5 mm (3.5 mm TRRS connector)

Power management
 Battery: BL-5C
 Voltage: 3.7 volts (nominal)
 Capacity: 1020 mAh
 Output: 3.8 Wh
 Talk time: Up to 3.8 hrs (GSM) Up to 3.5 hrs (W-CDMA)
 Stand-by: Up to 14 days (GSM) Up to 18 days (W-CDMA)

Messaging
 SMS (1000 character limit) and MMS support.
 MMS revision 1.3 (300 kilobyte limit)
 Nokia Xpress Audio Messaging (sends greetings with short voice clips)
 Email supports POP3, IMAP4 and SMTP protocols
 Supports instant messaging
 Includes Ovi by Nokia, Windows Live Messenger, Yahoo! Messenger

Java applications
 JSR 139 Connected, Limited Device Configuration (CLDC) 1.1
 JSR 118 MIDP 2.1j
 JSR 248 Mobile Service Architecture Subset for CLDC
 JSR 75 FileConnection and PIM API
 JSR 82 Java APIs for Bluetooth 1.1
 JSR 135 Mobile Media API 1.1
 JSR 172 J2ME Web Services Specification (RPC package)
 JSR 172 J2ME Web Services Specification (XML Parser package)
 JSR 177 Security and Trust Services API for J2ME (SATSA-APDU package)
 JSR 177 Security and Trust Services API for J2ME (SATSA-CRYPTO package)
 JSR 184 Mobile 3D Graphics API for J2ME 1.1
 JSR 205 Wireless Messaging API 2.0
 JSR 211 Content Handler API
 JSR 226 Scalable 2D Vector Graphics API
 JSR 234 Advanced Multimedia Supplements 1.0 (audio3d)
 JSR 234 Advanced Multimedia Supplements 1.0 (music)
 Nokia UI API 1.1
 Maximum JAR file size is around 1 MB.
 Maximum RAM for Java applications is 2048 kB (crash with "Out of Memory" error if you run a Java application that need more than 2048 kB).

Browsing
 Nokia Built-in browser.
 Opera Mini 7(also known as Next) & Lower
 UC Browser 8.2 & Lower

Sales package contents
 Nokia 2730 classic
 Nokia battery BL-5C
 Nokia 1 GB microSD card
 Nokia Connectivity Cable CA-100 (on some countries only)
 Nokia Stereo Headset WH-102
 Nokia Compact Charger AC-3
 User Guide

Operating system
 Nokia OS - Series 40

References

 
 
  

2730
Year of introduction missing